The Nezinscot River is a  river in Maine. It runs east from the confluence of its East Branch and West Branch in Buckfield to its mouth on the Androscoggin River in Turner.

See also
List of rivers of Maine

References

Maine Streamflow Data from the USGS
Maine Watershed Data From Environmental Protection Agency

Tributaries of the Kennebec River
Rivers of Androscoggin County, Maine
Rivers of Oxford County, Maine
Rivers of Maine